{{Infobox person
| name               = Cheryl Ladd
| image              = Cheryl Ladd (cropped).jpg
| caption            = Ladd in 2001
| birth_name         = Cheryl Jean Stoppelmoor
| birth_date         = 
| birth_place        = Huron, South Dakota, U.S.
| known_for          = Charlie's AngelsPurple HeartsMillenniumOne West WaikikiLas VegasGrace Kelly| occupation         = 
| years_active       = 1970–present
| spouse             = 
| children           = 2, including Jordan Ladd
| signature          = Cheryl Ladd Signature.svg
}}

Cheryl Ladd (born Cheryl Jean Stoppelmoor; July 12, 1951) is an American actress, singer, and author best known for her role as Kris Munroe in the ABC television series Charlie's Angels, whose cast she joined in its second season in 1977 to replace Farrah Fawcett-Majors. Ladd remained on the show until its cancellation in 1981. Her film roles include Purple Hearts (1984), Millennium (1989), Poison Ivy (1992), Permanent Midnight (1998), and Unforgettable (2017).

Early life
Ladd was born Cheryl Jean Stoppelmoor on July 12, 1951, in Huron, South Dakota, the second daughter of Dolores (née Katz), a waitress, and Marion Stoppelmoor, a railroad engineer. After high school, she traveled with the band The Music Shop and played in venues in the United States Midwest before settling in Los Angeles in 1970.

Career
Early roles
Ladd originally came to Hollywood to begin a career in music (she was known as "Cherie Moor" when she was the singing voice of Melody on Hanna-Barbera's Josie and the Pussycats animated series, and she also sang on the 1970 album of the same name). However, she soon began to land non-singing roles in commercials and episodic television, including guest appearances on shows such as on The Rookies, The Partridge Family, Police Woman, The Muppet Show, Search and Happy Days.

Charlie's Angels (1977–1981)

Ladd's big acting break came in 1977, when she was cast in the ABC television series Charlie's Angels, replacing star Farrah Fawcett, who left the show after only one season to pursue a movie career. To make the transition easier for audiences, producers cast Ladd as Fawcett's character's younger sister, Kris, instantly making her a part of the "Angels family". In the years to come, this practice of replacing Angels became a common event for the show. However, Ladd remained a part of the main cast for four seasons, until the show's cancelation in June 1981.

While starring in the highly rated Charlie's Angels, Ladd took advantage of her newfound popularity to further her musical career, guest starring in musical-comedy variety series and specials, performing the National Anthem at the Super Bowl XIV in January 1980, and releasing three albums. She had a top-40 Billboard Hot 100 single and a gold record.

Later career

Following Charlie's Angels, Ladd remained a familiar face on television and has starred in more than 30 made-for-television films, including as Grace Kelly, the Philadelphia heiress who became a Hollywood glamour girl and then a European princess, in a biopic that was begun shortly before Kelly's death. She also appeared in a number of feature films, such as Purple Hearts (1984), Millennium (1989), Poison Ivy (1992) (featuring Drew Barrymore, who later starred in the film adaptations of Charlie's Angels) and Permanent Midnight (1998). Ladd had the lead role in the television series One West Waikiki (1994–96) and made guest appearances in other TV shows such as Charmed, Hope and Faith and CSI: Miami. From 2003 until the show's cancellation in 2008 Ladd played Jillian Deline, the wife of the lead character Ed Deline (James Caan), in 29 episodes of the television drama series Las Vegas.

In 1996, Ladd published a children's book titled The Adventures of Little Nettie Windship. In 2005, she published Token Chick: A Woman's Guide to Golfing With the Boys, an autobiographical book which focused on her love of golf. For several years, Ladd hosted a golf tournament sponsored by Buick.

In September 2000, Ladd starred on Broadway, taking over the title role from Bernadette Peters in a revival of Irving Berlin's Annie Get Your Gun. She played the role until January 2001, when Reba McEntire took over.

On April 17, 2010, Ladd — along with her co-angel Jaclyn Smith — accepted the 2010 TV Land Pop Culture Award for Charlie's Angels.

Ladd has continued to appear in a number of TV productions, including the 2011 Hallmark Channel movie Love's Everlasting Courage, guest starring in the NCIS episode "Thirst" (as the love interest of medical examiner Dr. Donald "Ducky" Mallard), and the series Chuck'', playing Sarah Walker's mother.

On September 8, 2022, Ladd was announced as a contestant on season 31 of Dancing with the Stars. She was partnered with Louis Van Amstel. They were eliminated in the third week of the competition, placing 14th.

Personal life
She married fellow actor David Ladd (son of Alan Ladd) in 1973. They have a daughter, actress Jordan Ladd. Ladd took his surname as her own, keeping it after their divorce in 1980.

Ladd has been married to music producer Brian Russell since 1981 and has a stepdaughter, Lindsay Russell. Ladd is a celebrity ambassador for the child abuse prevention and treatment non-profit Childhelp.

Filmography

Film

Television

Discography

Studio albums

Singles

References

External links

 Official site
 
 
 
 
 
 Charlie's Angels website
 Interview on role in 1983 Grace Kelly movie, July 7, 2014, Ft. Wayne News-Sentinel
 The Perfect Wave 

1951 births
20th-century American actresses
21st-century American actresses
Actresses from South Dakota
American musical theatre actresses
American people of German descent
20th-century American singers
American film actresses
American women pop singers
American dance musicians
American stage actresses
American television actresses
Living people
People from Huron, South Dakota
Ladd family (show business)
20th-century American women singers
Best Musical or Comedy Actress Golden Globe (film) winners